Harry McKirdy (born 29 March 1997) is an English professional footballer who plays as a forward for  club Hibernian.

McKirdy is a product of the Aston Villa and Stoke City academies. While in Aston Villa's academy he played on loan at English Football League sides Stevenage, Crewe Alexandra and Newport County. He played for Carlisle United on a permanent basis during the 2019–20 season and then signed with Port Vale in September 2020, though he would only stay there for one season. He joined Swindon Town in August 2021 on a one year contract. He was named in the EFL League Two Team of the Season and as Swindon Town's Player of the Season for the 2021–22 campaign. He signed with Scottish Premiership club Hibernian in September 2022.

Career

Aston Villa
McKirdy was born in London and brought up in the Stoke-on-Trent area, where he attended St Joseph's College. He was on the books of Stoke City from the age of seven to fourteen, and then joined Aston Villa's academy. He signed a scholarship in 2013, and went on to sign a two-year professional contract with the "Villans" in 2016. He scored six goals in the 2016 HKFC Soccer Sevens tournament to win the golden boot, with one of his goals coming in the final as Villa beat West Ham United 2–0 to claim their sixth tournament title. He achieved this despite having only recently returned to fitness following a five-month lay-off with injury.

McKirdy trained with the first-team in 2016–17 pre-season, and joined League Two club Stevenage on 31 August 2016, on loan until January 2017. He made his senior debut for "Boro" on 24 September, coming on as a substitute in a 2–0 defeat to Exeter City at Broadhall Way. He scored his first career goal in an EFL Trophy tie against Brighton & Hove Albion Under-23s on 4 October. He marked his first league start with the winning goal in a 2–1 victory at Mansfield Town on 29 October. Head coach Darren Sarll said that "it was a terrific finish, the temperament of the lad to go through on his debut and finish like that, top drawer, the lad's going to be a good player".

In October 2017, McKirdy signed a contract extension to keep him at Villa Park until 2019. On 19 January 2018, he signed for Crewe Alexandra on loan to the end of the 2017–18 season. He scored on his debut after coming on as a second-half substitute in a 3–2 defeat to Wycombe Wanderers at Gresty Road on 20 January. Manager David Artell revealed that: "He even said that if money was an issue then he would look to pay his own way. That made me smile. That shows a real desire and hunger to come out on loan and play some football." McKirdy had been keen on the loan move with the "Railwaymen" and had consulted with Ashley Westwood and Steve Bruce before making up his mind. He scored three goals in 16 League Two games at Crewe Alex.

On 31 January 2019, McKirdy joined League Two side Newport County on loan until the end of the 2018–19 season. He made his debut for the "Exiles" on 19 February as a second-half substitute in a 4–1 win at Notts County. He scored his first goal for Newport on 13 April in a 3–0 win against Cambridge United. He was part of the team that reached the League Two play-off final at Wembley Stadium on 25 May, although he was an unused substitute in the final, which ended in a 1–0 defeat to Tranmere Rovers. He was used primarily as a substitute by manager Michael Flynn, making 11 substitute appearances and only two starts during his time at Rodney Parade, scoring one goal. McKirdy was released by Aston Villa in May 2019.

Carlisle United
McKirdy signed a one-year deal with League Two club Carlisle United on 11 June 2019. He scored a headed goal six minutes into his debut for the "Cumbrians", in a 2–1 win over Crawley Town on 3 August. Manager Steven Pressley said after the game that "I'm pleased for him because he’s a really good kid. He takes a bit of managing, but he's a good kid underneath that". McKirdy scored 11 goals from 38 games to finish as United's top-scorer for the 2019–20 season. However he was released in May 2020. Manager Chris Beech said that "I respect the skill sets he has got... [but] Harry wasn't happy... [and] I don’t want to get a footballer in a headlock and make him do something he doesn’t want to do".

Port Vale
McKirdy signed a one-year contract with League Two side Port Vale on 11 September 2020 after impressing manager John Askey on trial. He scored his first goal for the "Valiants" on 10 November, in a 4–2 win over Liverpool U21 at Vale Park in the group stages of the EFL Trophy. He failed to establish himself in the first-team however and was transfer-listed in December. Interim manager Danny Pugh deselected him from the club's 22-man squad the following month. McKirdy played for Leicester City U23's in February. New Vale manager Darrell Clarke went on to state that his regret at being unable to play McKirdy in the second half of the 2020–21 season and that he was still working to improve the player's mindset to prevent McKirdy's confidence from hindering his relationship with his coaches. On 31 March, the club gained special dispensation from the EFL to register McKirdy back on the 22-man squad, in place of the injured Zak Mills. Nevertheless he was one of 15 players released from the club in May 2021.

Swindon Town
McKirdy scored twice in a pre-season friendly for Swindon Town in July 2021 and signed a one-year deal with the League Two club on 4 August; Ben Chorley, the "Robins" director of football said that "his attitude in both training and across all three preseason games has been fantastic". He scored on his League Two debut for the "Robins", a 3–1 win at Scunthorpe United on the opening day of the 2021–22 season. On New Year's Day, McKirdy scored four of Swindon's goals in their 5–2 win over Northampton Town at the County Ground. In his post-match interview he reflected that "I just felt a little bit livelier out there... I need to try and get to a place where I'm like that every week." On 7 January, he scored against Premier League champions Manchester City in a 4–1 home defeat in the FA Cup third round. On 13 January, he extended his contract with the club beyond the end of the season. He was named in the League Two Team of the Season at the EFL Awards for the 2021–22 season, and later Swindon Town's Player of the Season at the club's annual awards ceremony. He scored two goals in the play-off semi-final first leg victory over former club Port Vale, however would miss his penalty kick in the penalty shoot-out defeat at the end of the second leg.

He was sent off in the second game of the 2022–23 season, after being shown two yellow cards during a 0–0 draw with Salford City. He was reported to have subsequently gone into the referee's room and thrown a protein shake onto the referee's suit, leading to him being charged by The Football Association and being handed a three-match suspension and £1,500 fine after he admitted to "aggressive and improper" behaviour.

Hibernian
On 1 September 2022, McKirdy signed a three-year contract with Scottish Premiership club Hibernian after being bought for an undisclosed fee. The deal between Hibernian and Swindon came close to collapsing, but was rushed through on the final day of the transfer window as Hibernian manager Lee Johnson was short of attacking options having already allowed Christian Doidge to leave on loan.

Style of play
McKirdy is a versatile attacker, able to play in any forward position, either centrally or out wide. Crewe boss David Artell called McKirdy "a natural goalscorer" and "one of those nuisance forwards, who gets under the feet of centre-halves". He has been criticised for his temperament, particularly in regards to his reactions to jeering by fans both on the pitch and on social media.

Career statistics

Honours
Individual
EFL League Two Team of the Season: 2021–22
Swindon Town Player of the Season: 2021–22

References

1997 births
Living people
Footballers from Greater London
Footballers from Stoke-on-Trent
People educated at St. Joseph's College, Stoke-on-Trent
English footballers
Association football forwards
Stoke City F.C. players
Aston Villa F.C. players
Stevenage F.C. players
Crewe Alexandra F.C. players
Newport County A.F.C. players
Carlisle United F.C. players
Port Vale F.C. players
Swindon Town F.C. players
Hibernian F.C. players
English Football League players
Scottish Professional Football League players